Michael Seibel (born October 7, 1982) is a managing director at Y Combinator and co-founder of two startups – Justin.tv/Twitch and Socialcam. He first joined Y Combinator in 2013, advising hundreds of startups, and has been active in promoting diversity efforts among startup founders.

Biography

Seibel was born in Brooklyn and calls New York City his favorite city. He moved to East Brunswick, New Jersey as a pre-teen and is a 2000 graduate of East Brunswick High School. At Yale, he majored in political science and became friends with Justin Kan. He graduated in 2005. After graduation, he worked as finance director for Kweisi Mfume's unsuccessful run for the U.S. Senate in 2006. He then moved to Silicon Valley to co-found Justin.tv, and became CEO at the company (from 2007 to 2011). He then became CEO of Socialcam, a social video-sharing app that launched in March 2011 and sold to Autodesk for $60 million in 2012 (after existing for only 18 months). He became a part-time partner at Y Combinator in January 2013, and joined Y Combinator as its first African-American partner in October 2014. In 2014 Justin.tv was renamed Twitch Interactive and later that year sold to Amazon for $970 million.

Some of his investments include Cruise (which sold to GM for $1 billion), Luxe, Walker and Company, Locol, Bluesmart, Scentbird, Lugg, Jopwell, Triplebyte and Bellabeat.

In 2016, he mentioned the need for more startups serving parents with young kids. He mentioned Clever and Panorama Education - both Y Combinator graduates, as promising examples. He became CEO of the Y Combinator Core unit in 2016, where he will help execute Y Combinator's plan to wind down fellowships and to start a MOOC that serves as an open-to-anyone, lightweight version of YC.

Before joining YC, Michael Seibel was a key mentor to the co-founders of Airbnb and recommended them to Y Combinator.

On June 10, 2020, it was announced that Seibel was named a Reddit board member, replacing Alexis Ohanian, who resigned on June 5, 2020, in response to the murder of George Floyd. In his resignation announcement, Alexis Ohanian had urged Reddit's board of directors to fill his vacant board seat with a black candidate. Reddit later named Seibel as the "first black board member in the company's history".

On Dec 15, 2020, it was announced that Seibel was named to the Dropbox board of directors.

See also

 Emmett Shear
 Kyle Vogt
 Justin Kan

References

1982 births
Living people
21st-century American businesspeople
Y Combinator people
Reddit people
African-American businesspeople
People from Brooklyn
People from East Brunswick, New Jersey
East Brunswick High School alumni
21st-century African-American people
20th-century African-American people